We Love Life is the seventh and final studio album by English rock band Pulp, released on 22 October 2001 by Island Records. It reached number six on the UK Albums Chart, with a total chart stay of only three weeks. Written and recorded after the tumultuous sessions for This Is Hardcore, We Love Life saw the band move toward a more relaxed and natural sound, shepherded by producer Scott Walker. Walker had replaced original producer Chris Thomas, whom the band had worked with on previous albums.

We Love Life saw positive critical reception and charted at number 6 on the UK album charts.

Background
We Love Life was intended to be a departure from the disillusionment of the band's previous album, This Is Hardcore, in that it featured a more organic sound and an emphasis on nature, which Cocker found interest in "because it is dangerous in some ways". Cocker explained, "I never took any notice of nature when I was a kid. I thought we'd all be living on space stations or floating metropolises by now. But after This Is Hardcore, which was a very alienated record, it was time to go back to simpler things, like this, the natural world." At the same time, Cocker stated, "This isn't Pulp's pastoral album. I was very aware of avoiding hippy dippy stuff."

The band had initially begun recording with Chris Thomas, who had produced their past two albums. However, his more rigid style of recording conflicted with the band's desire for looser sessions, resulting in the recordings being shelved. The final album was produced by Scott Walker. Keyboardist Candida Doyle recalled, "I certainly thought about leaving [after shelving the Thomas sessions] but I realised that I'd still feel shit even if I did. If Scott Walker hadn't come about, I don't think we'd have bothered to finish this LP." The band, who had met Walker at the 2000 Meltdown Festival run by Walker, had been longtime fans of Walker.

Walker's own album 'Til the Band Comes In is mocked in the lyrics of the We Love Life single "Bad Cover Version". Cocker claims the lyric was written long before Walker became involved in the album's production and recalled the moment of recording the song as "embarrassing".

Title and artwork
The album's title was originally to be Pulp Love Life, but this was vetoed as Cocker felt that the title looked confusing on an album cover—he explained, "It always looked like the name of the band's Pulp and the album's called Love Life." The album was then renamed Pulp, reflecting the "uncluttered" nature of the album. With the September 11 terrorist attacks, however, the album was renamed to the more universal We Love Life. Cocker recalled, "To be honest, I was really freaked out when that World Trade Center thing happened. ... So in the aftermath of that, I thought, actually this Love Life business isn't a bad sentiment at this particular time."

The minimal cover art (by Peter Saville) shows a set of initial capitals held in the collection of St. Bride Printing Library in London. They were engraved in wood by or for Louis Pouchée around the 1820s.

Reception

Initial critical response to We Love Life was very positive. The album received an average score of 84 at Metacritic, based on 20 reviews. The music review online magazine Pitchfork placed We Love Life at number 194 on their list of the top 200 albums of the 2000s.

Steve Hobbs of Q Magazine wrote of the album, "Cocker's lyrics are still sharp and beautifully observed, just a little less personal. But in many ways, it's a more familiar Pulp record than This Is Hardcore." Stephen Thomas Erlewine of AllMusic called the album "an emotional and musical breakthrough, finding the band leaping beyond the claustrophobic Hardcore and consolidating their previous obsessions, creating a textured, reflective record that in its own measured way is as impassioned as Different Class."

Track listing

Personnel
Credits adapted from liner notes.

Additional musicians
 Alasdair Malloy – percussion , glass harmonica 
 Luís Jardim – percussion 
 Danny Cummings – percussion 
 Julian Poole – percussion 
 Steve Hilton – programming 
 Howie B – programming 
 Richard Hawley – lap steel guitar , twelve-string guitar 
 The Swingle Singers – backing vocals 
 Joanna Forbes – musical direction, vocal arrangements
 Beverly Skeete – backing vocals 
 Sylvia James – backing vocals 
 Claudia Fontaine – backing vocals 
 Jeremy Shaw – keyboards 
 Scott Walker – additional keyboards and tree effects , baritone guitar 
 Andy Findon – ocarinas and flutes  
 Caspar Cronk – musical saw  
 Timos Papadopoulos at the Institute of Sound and Vibration Research, Southampton University under supervision of Professor Phil Nelson – birdsong 
 Philip Sheppard – five string electric cello 
 Metro Voices – choir

Production
 Scott Walker – production, mixing
 Peter Walsh – co-production, engineering, mixing; choir engineering 
 Matt Lawrence – assistant engineering; additional choir engineering 
 Chris Blair – mastering
 Clive Goddard – choir engineering 
 Geoff Foster – strings recording
 Gavyn Wright – strings leading
 Isobel Griffiths – orchestral contracting
 Jenny O'Grady – choral co-ordination
 Steve Price – choir recording
Arrangement
 Scott Walker – strings , ten double basses 
 Brian Gascoigne – strings , ten double basses , choir 
 Candida Doyle – strings 

Artwork
 Jarvis Cocker – art direction
 Peter Saville – art direction
 Howard Wakefield – design
 Marcus Werner Hed – design

Charts

References

External links

We Love Life at YouTube (streamed copy where licensed)
 

Pulp (band) albums
2001 albums
Island Records albums
Albums produced by Scott Walker (singer)
PolyGram albums
Albums produced by Peter Walsh